Cwm Bwchel Farmhouse, Llanthony, Monmouthshire is a farmhouse dating from the late-Medieval period. It carries a date stone of 1694, which probably refers to a period of reconstruction. The farmhouse is Grade II* listed and a number of the ancillary buildings on the farmstead have their own Grade II listings.

History and description
The architectural historian John Newman describes Cwm Bwchel as an "inaccessible farmstead". The farm is sited on a hill overlooking Llanthony Priory. Cadw gives a construction date of the late medieval period. Newman notes the date stone on the doorcase with the owner's initials and a date of 1694. Cadw attributes this to a 17th-century reconstruction. The house was refaced in the 18th and 19th centuries. It remains a private home and the 20th century saw further remodelling of the ancillary buildings.

Cwn Bwchel is constructed of Old Red Sandstone rubble under a roof of Welsh slate. The farmhouse is Grade II* listed, with the barn, former kitchen and stables having their own Grade II listings.

Notes

References 
 

Grade II* listed buildings in Monmouthshire
Dovecotes
Grade II* listed houses in Wales
Houses completed in 1692
Farmhouses in Wales